The 2023–24 CONCACAF Nations League will be the third season of the CONCACAF Nations League, an international association football competition involving the men's national teams of the 41 member associations of CONCACAF. The competition will see a format change, with League A now featuring sixteen teams in two groups of a Swiss system, followed by a quarter-final round. The Nations League will begin with the group stage in September 2023, and will conclude with the Nations League Finals in March 2024. The Nations League also serves as qualification for CONCACAF teams to the 2024 Copa América in the United States.

Format
On 28 February 2023, CONCACAF announced a format change for the 2023–24 season of the CONCACAF Nations League. As a result, no teams will be relegated from the 2022–23 season.

The size of League A will be increased from twelve to sixteen teams, and will now feature a quarter-final round. The twelve lowest-ranked teams in the CONCACAF Rankings of March 2023 will enter the group stage, now using a Swiss-system tournament format. The teams will be divided into two groups of six teams, with each team playing four matches against group opponents (two at home and two away). The top four teams will advance to the quarter-finals, and will be joined by the four top-ranked teams in the CONCACAF Rankings of March 2023. The teams advancing from the group stage will be drawn into ties against the top-ranked teams, which will be played on a two-legged home-and-away basis. The four quarter-final winners will advance to the Nations League Finals, which retains its previous format of a semi-final round, third place play-off and final match to determine the champions. In addition, the 2023–24 Nations League will determine the six CONCACAF teams which will qualify as guests for the 2024 Copa América in the United States. The quarter-final winners will qualify directly to the tournament, while the losers will advance to a qualifying play-off, featuring two single-leg matches.

League B will remain unchanged, featuring sixteen teams divided into four groups of four. Each team will play six matches in a double round-robin home-and-away format (three at home and three away). Following the format change, League C will be reduced from thirteen to nine teams and from four to three groups. Teams will be divided into three groups of three teams, with each team playing four matches in a double round-robin home-and-away format (two at home and two away).

Promotion and relegation will resume for the 2023–24 season, with the fifth and sixth placed teams in League A and the fourth-placed teams in League B being relegated for the next season. The group winners of Leagues B and C will be promoted, as will the best second-placed team of League C.

Entrants
All of CONCACAF's 41 member associations will enter in the competition. Teams will be divided into leagues based on their results of the 2022–23 season, while the pots will be determined by the CONCACAF Ranking of March 2023. The four top-ranked teams in League A will receive a bye to the quarter-finals. The group stage draw will take place on 16 May 2023.

League A

League A or B

League B

League B or C

League C

Schedule
Below is the schedule of the 2023–24 CONCACAF Nations League.

League A

Group A

Group B

Quarter-finals
The first and second legs will be played in November 2023. The winners will advance to the Nations League Finals and qualify for the 2024 Copa América, while the losers will advance to the Copa América qualifying play-offs.

|}

Nations League Finals

Bracket

Semi-finals

Third place play-off

Final

League B

Group A

Group B

Group C

Group D

League C

Group A

Group B

Group C

Ranking of second-placed teams

References

External links

2023-24
Nations League
September 2023 sports events in North America
October 2023 sports events in North America
November 2023 sports events in North America
March 2024 sports events in North America